Privolzhsky District is an administrative and municipal district (raion), one of the twenty-one in Ivanovo Oblast, Russia. It is located in the north of the oblast. Its administrative center is the town of Privolzhsk. Population:   28,730 (2002 Census);  The population of Privolzhsk accounts for 64.6% of the district's total population.

Administrative and municipal status
The town of Privolzhsk serves as the administrative center of the district. Prior to the adoption of the Law #145-OZ On the Administrative-Territorial Division of Ivanovo Oblast in December 2010, it was administratively incorporated separately from the district. Municipally, Privolzhsk is incorporated within Privolzhsky Municipal District as Privolzhskoye Urban Settlement.

The town of Plyos was also administratively incorporated separately from the district prior to the adoption of the Law #145-OZ. Municipally, Plyos is also incorporated within Privolzhsky Municipal District as Plyosskoye Urban Settlement.

References

Notes

Sources

Districts of Ivanovo Oblast

